RAF Hunmanby Moor, (also known as RAF Filey), was a Royal Air Force training camp during the Second World War in Hunmanby, East Riding of Yorkshire, England. The site was commandeered at the outbreak of war and returned to civilian use as a holiday camp in 1945. From 1942, many RAF Regiment training courses were run at the site.

History
The Butlins holiday camp at Filey was requisitioned at the outbreak of the Second World War to act as a training camp for recruits. Although located near the village of Hunmanby, it was intended to be known as, and post-war was called, Butlins Filey. On initial commencement of military activity, the site was called RAF Filey. In 1942, it became an RAF Regiment training depot, and during the next three years, until 1945, several RAF Regiment squadrons and training schools were allocated here. The RAF depot at Filey was the first of its type in the RAF, and so instructors from the Brigade of Guards and the Royal Marines were drafted in to help with training. The depot moved soon afterwards to RAF Belton Park in Lincolnshire, although Regiment training continued at Hunmanby Moor.

In 1944, The Times reported on the 2,000 men from the West Indies who had arrived at Hunmanby Moor for their 12 week basic training. A fictionalised account of West Indian recruits at RAF Hunmanby Moor features in Andrea Levy's book "Small Island".

One of the last units to leave Hunmanby Moor was the RAF Regiment's LAA Gunnery School, which was posted to Nethertown in August 1945. Thereafter, the whole of the site was returned to the Butlins company and civilian use.

Based units

Notable personnel
Michael Beetham, spent February 1943 at the base awaiting aircrew training

Notes

References

Sources

Military history of the East Riding of Yorkshire
Royal Air Force stations in Yorkshire
Royal Air Force stations of World War II in the United Kingdom